16 is the fourth studio album by Finnish singer Robin, released on 22 September 2014. Two singles preceded the release; "Kesärenkaat" and "Parasta just nyt". The album peaked at number one on the Finnish Albums Chart in October 2014.

Track listing

Charts

Release history

See also
List of number-one albums of 2014 (Finland)

References

2014 albums
Robin (singer) albums